David Donald may refer to:

 David Donald (cricketer) (1933–2016), New Zealand cricketer
 David Donald (footballer) (born 1987), Scottish football defender
 David Herbert Donald (1920–2009), American historian
 David Grahame Donald (1891–1976), RAF officer